Great Britain competed at the 2013 Summer Universiade in Kazan, Russia.

Badminton

Great Britain will be represented by five badminton players.

Men

Women

Fencing

Great Britain will be represented by three fencers.

Football

Men's tournament

Great Britain will be represented by both a men's and women's team.

The men's team will participate in Group C.

Roster

Head coach: James Ellis
Team manager: Stew Fowlie
Assistant team manager: Ross Campbell

Group play

Quarter final

Gold medal match

Women's tournament 

The women's team will participate in Group C.

Roster

Head coach: Kay Cossington
Assistant coach: Rehanne Skinner
Goalkeeper coach: Steven Fraser 
Team manager: Alex Zurita

Group play

Group play

Quarter finals

Semi final 

Gold Medal Match

Gymnastics

Great Britain will be represented in artistic gymnastics.

Artistic gymnastics
Eight gymnasts will compete in the artistic gymnastics competition.

Judo

Great Britain will be represented by three male and one female judoka.

Men

Women

Rugby sevens

Great Britain will be represented by both a men's and women's team.

Men's tournament 
The men's team will participate in Group B.
Roster

Head coach: Russell Earnshaw
Assistant coach: Nick Wakley
Team manager: Adrian Evans

Group play

 Quarter final

Semi final

Bronze medal match

Women's tournament 

The women's team will participate in Group B.

Roster

Head coach: Susie Appleby
Assistant coach: Rhys Edwards
Team manager: Sophie Bennett

Group Play

Quarter finals

semi final

Bronze medal match

Shooting

Great Britain will be represented by ten athletes.

Men

Women

Swimming

Great Britain will be represented by eleven swimmers.

Tennis

Great Britain will be represented by six tennis players.

References

Nations at the 2013 Summer Universiade
2013 in British sport
2013